Craig Graham is an Australian producer of television shows such as "The Embassy", 2014 Channel 9. "Air Rescue", 2013 Channel 7. "Hatch, Match and Dispatch", 2016 ABC. "Moment of Truth", 2016 ABC iView. "Maurice's Big Adventure", 2016 ABC Kids. "The Justine Clarke Show", 2017 ABC Kids. RPA, Once Upon a Time in Cabramatta, The Great Outdoors, Border Security, Zumbo, and Contract Killers.

Career
Graham got his first break in television as a researcher on Money. In 2001, he produced The Great Outdoors (2001–2003) for the Seven Network. It was a presenter-driven lifestyle series about the best places to visit in Australia and overseas.

In 2002, Graham collaborated with Dr Harry Cooper and wrote The Possum Thief, a fictional picture book for young children published by Pan MacMillan Australia. Graham's book led to the trilogy The Adventures of Dr Harry and Scarlet.

In 2004, Graham produced Border Security, watching the drama of people passing through the international customs zones at Sydney and Melbourne airports. He wanted to highlight the experience of asylum-seekers or refugees but, after nine months of filming, no suitable story arose.

Over the ensuing five years, Graham produced shows, including The Code: Crime and Justice, Fire 000, Customs with Vince Colosimo and RPA.

In 2009, the Special Broadcasting Service (SBS) commissioned Fredbird Entertainment, Graham's independent production company, to produce Zumbo, an Australian observational documentary series about master patissier Adriano Zumbo.

Fredbird Entertainment and Northern Pictures co-produced Once Upon a Time in Cabramatta for SBS. The first episode attracted 620,000 viewers. Graham produced the mini-series, broadcast in January 2012, which described the turbulent story of a multicultural Sydney suburb. The Age described Graham as a "gifted storyteller" whose treatment of the subject was "pitch-perfect, the ideal blend of exposition and witness accounts". In October 2012 Once Upon A Time in Cabramatta was nominated for the 2012 Walkley awards for Excellence in Journalism.

Filmography

Publications
 2002 | Graham, Craig | The Possum Thief | Pan Macmillan Australia
 2004 | Graham, Craig | The Pig Circus | Pan Macmillan Australia
 2006 | Graham, Craig | The Amazing Adventures of Dr Harry and Scarlet: Fly, Shadow, Fly!

References

External links 
 

Australian television producers
Living people
Year of birth missing (living people)